Hyalaethea bivitreata is a moth of the subfamily Arctiinae. It was described by George Hampson in 1909. It is found on the Tanimbar Islands of Indonesia.

References

 

Arctiinae
Moths described in 1909